Ada Deer (born 1935) is a member of the Menominee Indian Tribe of Wisconsin and a  Native American advocate, scholar and civil servant. As an activist she opposed the federal termination of tribes from the 1950s following the bills led by Arthur Vivian Watkins, a Republican senator. During the Clinton Administration, Deer served as Assistant Secretary of the Interior for Indian Affairs.

Background
Deer was born in Keshena, Wisconsin in 1935 and grew up living on an Indian reservation. Deer was an active member of the Menominee tribe, which is located in the northeast side of Wisconsin. She studied and obtained a bachelor's degree from the University of Wisconsin–Madison and a Master of Social Work from the New York School of Social Work (later Columbia University School of Social Work). Deer later went on to become a Menominee social worker.

Native American advocacy
Following the completion of her graduate work, Deer returned to the Midwest to be closer to the Menominee Nation, settling in Minneapolis. She found few local services in place for Native Americans living in urban settings. Due to her background in social services, Ada worked to advocate on their behalf with federal authorities. She also led a newer generation of Native American leaders which helped gain acceptance of self-determination in things that they do but also works to implement it consistently.  Ada Deer led the Menominee in their drive to restore the ties that their tribe had with the federal government in 1991. In 1991, she became the head of the Native American Rights Fund which gave her the ability to restore the ties with the federal government. This large accomplishment led to immense leadership opportunities. In the book, American Indians by Hagan, Ada Deer is described as a part of the "increasing number of women" that are making a difference in the Native American environment.

Since the "Termination Era" of the 1950s and 1960s (resulting in reduced federal oversight of Native American affairs), the Menominee tribe had been governed by a corporate body called Menominee Enterprise, Inc. Menominee Enterprises, Inc. was controlled by a voting trust and Menominee tribal members had no shares in the corporation.  Four of the voting trust members were Menominee; however, five votes were required in order for the trust to take action. In the 1960s and 1970s, there was renewed Congressional involvement in rebuilding tribal infrastructure, both socially and economically.

During that time, Deer became involved in a group called DRUMS (Determination of Right and Unity for Menominee Shareholders) in opposition to Menominee Enterprise's proposed sale of former Menominee lands.  At first, Deer encountered difficulty with Wayne Aspinall, the chairman of the Interior Committee in Congress, who had supported terminating the Menominee's status as a federally recognized tribe. .  She took frequent trips to Washington but was denied the chance to speak with Aspinall. After he was defeated for his seat,  Deer raised publicity as well as support for the Menominee cause.

Her efforts, along with many other Menominees, played a part in bringing the Termination Era to a close. On December 22, 1973, President Richard Nixon signed the Menominee Restoration Act. This legislation restored official federal recognition to the Menominee tribe. Because of her active participation in changing the legislation, Ada Deer was the first woman to chair the Menominee tribe in Wisconsin. From 1974 to 1976, Deer served as chair of the Menominee Restoration Committee. Before and after her term in the Bureau of Indian Affairs (BIA), Deer served on the National Support Committee (NSC) of the Native American Rights Fund (NARF). She has served as chair of the NSC and chair of the NARF board of directors.

Federal government 
In 1993, Deer was appointed Assistant Secretary of the Interior by President Bill Clinton, serving as head of the Bureau of Indian Affairs (BIA) from 1993 to 1997. Deer was the first woman to hold this position. Secretary of the Interior Bruce Babbitt praised her for her "lifelong commitment to American Indian rights, to improving the lives of American Indians, and to the strengthening of tribal governments".

During this period, she was a delegate to the United Nations Human Rights Committee.  From January to May 1997, she served as Chair of the National Indian Gaming Commission.

Political activity
Deer has been involved in electoral politics since the 1970s. In both 1978 to 1982, Deer ran for Secretary of State of Wisconsin, losing both elections.  In 1984, Deer served as vice chair of Walter Mondale's 1984 presidential campaign.

In 1992, she ran for a seat the U.S. House of Representatives, mounting a campaign in Wisconsin's 2nd congressional district. She won the Democratic primary without "soft money" funding from political action committees. Following her primary win, a local newspaper ran a photo of Deer proudly holding a sign reading "Me Nominee" in a reference to her tribal membership. Ada Deer became the first Native American woman in Wisconsin that ran for U.S. Congress. However, she lost the general election to incumbent Scott Klug, a Republican. 

In 1993, Deer was appointed as assistant secretary of the U.S. Department of Interior of the Bureau of Indian Affairs. While in office, she helped create a federal policy for more than 550 federally recognized tribes.  

In 2020, Deer was a Joe Biden delegate at the 2020 Democratic National Convention (DNC). Deer endorsed State Treasurer Sarah Godlewski's campaign for Senate in the 2022 election.

Educational career
Deer has taught in the School of Social Work at the University of Wisconsin–Madison since 1977, currently holding the title of Distinguished Lecturer. Since 1999, she has been the director of the American Indian Studies Department at UW–Madison.  During her tenure, she co-founded Milwaukee's Indian Community School. She also created the first program at the University to provide social work training on Native American reservations. In addition, she is a fellow at the Harvard Institute of Politics at the John F. Kennedy School of Government.

Notable achievements
First member of the Menominee Tribe to graduate from the University of Wisconsin–Madison (1957)
First member of the Menominee Tribe to receive a master's degree (1961)
First woman to serve as chair of the Menominee Restoration Committee (1974)
Pollitzer Award, Ethical Cultural Society, N.Y. (1975)
First woman to head the Bureau of Indian Affairs (1993)
Included as one of 51 "accomplished practitioners and educators" in the book Celebrating Social Work: Faces and Voices of the Formative Years (Council on Social Work Education, 2003)
In 2000 she was a National Women's History Month honoree.

Past national board service
American Indian Policy Review Commission
Americans for Indian Opportunity
Common Cause National Governing Board, elected 1973
Council on Foundations
National Association of Social Workers
Native American Rights Fund

References

Bibliography

External links
 

1935 births
Living people
Female Native American leaders
Members of American gaming commissions
People from Keshena, Wisconsin
University of Wisconsin–Madison faculty
University of Wisconsin–Madison alumni
Columbia University School of Social Work alumni
Harvard Kennedy School staff
Menominee people
Native American women in politics
Clinton administration personnel
United States Bureau of Indian Affairs personnel
People from Fitchburg, Wisconsin
21st-century American women
20th-century Native American women
20th-century Native Americans
21st-century Native American women
21st-century Native Americans